Lactosylceramide 4-alpha-galactosyltransferase is an enzyme that in humans is encoded by the A4GALT gene.

The protein encoded by this gene catalyzes the transfer of galactose to lactosylceramide to form globotriaosylceramide, which has been identified as the P(k) antigen of the P blood group system. The encoded protein, which is a type II membrane protein found in the Golgi, is also required for the synthesis of the bacterial verotoxins receptor.

References

Further reading

External links
         
 

Human proteins